Mount Cushman State Forest covers  in Rochester, Vermont in Windsor County. The forest is managed by the Vermont Department of Forests, Parks, and Recreation. It is landlocked and there is no legal public access to the forest.

References

External links
Official website

Vermont state forests
Protected areas of Windsor County, Vermont
Rochester, Vermont